was a Japanese daimyō of the late Edo period, who ruled the Okazaki Domain.

References

|-

1817 births
1883 deaths
Rōjū
Daimyo
Kyoto Shoshidai
People from Tokyo